Tumba is a station on the Stockholm commuter rail in Tumba, Botkyrka Municipality, Sweden, approximately 23 km from Stockholm C, between the stations of Tullinge and Rönninge. The station consists of two platforms with a ticket hall with entrance from a pedestrian bridge and was introduced in its present form in the year 1994. In 2019, the number of passengers boarding on an average weekday was estimated at 9,500.

In 1982 the station was the filming location for the ABBA video for their song The Day Before You Came.

References

Railway stations in Stockholm County